Richard Lowndes (?1707–75), of Winslow, Buckinghamshire, was an English politician.

He was the son of Robert Lowndes of Winslow, Buckinghamshire and educated at Eton School and Worcester College, Oxford. He succeeded his father in 1727, inheriting considerable estates, including Winslow Hall. He later passed Winslow Hall to his son on the latter's marriage in 1766.

He was appointed High Sheriff of Buckinghamshire for 1738–39 and was elected MP for Buckinghamshire (1741–1774).

He married Essex, the daughter and coheiress of Charles Shales, banker, of London, in  St Paul's Cathedral in 1730. They had 1 son (William, who later changed his name to William Shelby to inherit Whaddon Hall) and 2 daughters.

References

1707 births
1775 deaths
People from Winslow, Buckinghamshire
People educated at Eton College
Alumni of Worcester College, Oxford
High Sheriffs of Buckinghamshire
Members of the Parliament of Great Britain for English constituencies
British MPs 1741–1747
British MPs 1747–1754
British MPs 1754–1761
British MPs 1761–1768
British MPs 1768–1774